The Bangladesh Squash Racket Federation is the national federation for squash and is responsible for governing the sport in Bangladesh. Faruk Khan, member of parliament, is the President of Bangladesh Squash Racket Federation. Brig Gen G M Quamrul Islam, SPP (R)  is the Secretary General of the Bangladesh Squash Racket Federation.

History
The Bangladesh Squash Racket Federation was established in 1978.

References

National members of the World Squash Federation
1978 establishments in Bangladesh
Sports organizations established in 1978
Squash Racket
Organisations based in Dhaka